Joseph Warren Dauben (born 29 December 1944, Santa Monica) is a Herbert H. Lehman Distinguished Professor of History at the Graduate Center of the City University of New York. He obtained his PhD from Harvard University.

His fields of expertise are the history of science, the history of mathematics, the scientific revolution, the sociology of science, intellectual history, the 17th and 18th centuries, the history of Chinese science, and the history of botany.

Positions
Dauben is a 1980 Guggenheim fellow.

He is a fellow of the American Association for the Advancement of Science, and a fellow of the New York Academy of Sciences (since 1982).

Dauben is an elected member (1991) of the International Academy of the History of Science and an elected foreign member (2001) of German Academy of Sciences Leopoldina.

In 1985–1994 Dauben served as the chair of the Executive Committee of the International Commission on the History of Mathematics.

Dauben delivered an invited lecture at the 1998 International Congress of Mathematicians in Berlin on Karl Marx's mathematical work.

The creator of non-standard analysis, Abraham Robinson was the subject of Dauben's 1995 book Abraham Robinson. It was reviewed positively by Moshé Machover, but the review noted that it avoids discussing any of Robinson's negative aspects, and "in this respect [the book] borders on the hagiographic, painting a portrait without warts."

In 2002 Dauben became an honorary member of the Institute for History of Natural Science of the Chinese Academy of Sciences.

Publications
 1979: Georg Cantor, His Mathematics and Philosophy of the Infinite, Harvard University Press, reprinted 1989 by Princeton University Press
 1995: Abraham Robinson, The Creation of Nonstandard Analysis: A Personal and Mathematical Odyssey, Princeton University Press

Articles, reviews, and essays
 1985: "Abraham Robinson and Nonstandard Analysis: History, Philosophy, and Foundations of Mathematics", in William Aspray and Philip Kitcher, eds. History and Philosophy of Modern Mathematics, pages 177–200, Minnesota Studies in Philososphy of Science XI, University of Minnesota Press, 1988. Online here.
 1991: "La Matematica," in W. Shea editor, Storia delle Scienze. LeScienze Fisiche e Astronomiche (Milano: Banca Popolare di Milano, and Einaudi, 1992) pp. 258–280
 1992: "Are There Revolutions in Mathematics?" in The Space of Mathematics (editors J. Echieverria, A. Ibarra and T. Mormann) (Berlin: De Gruyter), pp. 203–226.
 1992: "Conceptual Revolutions and the History of Mathematics: Two Studies in the Growth of Knowledge", Chapter 4 of D. Gillies, editor, Revolutions in Mathematics, Clarendon Press pp. 49–71.
 1992: "Revolutions Revisited", Chapter 5 of D. Gillies, editor, Revolutions in Mathematics (Oxford: Clarendon Press), pp. 72–82.
 2008: "Suan shu shu. A book on numbers and computations", translated from the Chinese and with commentary by Joseph W. Dauben. Archive for History of Exact Sciences 62(2): 91–178.

See also
Criticism of non-standard analysis

References

External links

Harvard University alumni
21st-century American historians
American male non-fiction writers
Living people
American historians of mathematics
1944 births
People from Santa Monica, California
Lehman College faculty
Historians from California
21st-century American male writers